Phestia is an extinct genus of clam belonging to order Nuculanida and family Nuculanidae.

Specimens have been found on all seven continents.

Species 
P. basedowi Etheridge Jr., 1907
P. corrugata Hoare et al., 1989
P. darwini de Koninck, 1877
P. guizhouensis Xu, 1980
P. hunanensis Ku and Chen, 1963
P. inflata Morningstar, 1922
P. inflatiformis Chernyshev, 1989
P. jamesi Biakov, 2002
P. lusabaensis Dickins, 1999
P. nova Waterhouse, 1983
P. obtusa Hoare et al. 1989
P. pandoraeformis Stevens, 1858
P. perumbonata White, 1880
P. sabbatinae Pagani, 2004
P. sinuata Dembskaja, 1972
P. speluncaria Geinitz, 1848
P. subucuta Waagen, 1881
P. thompsoni Reed, 1932
P. undosa Muromtseva, 1984
P. wortheni Hoare et al. 1989
P. zhejiangensis Liu, 1976

References 

Paleozoic life
Prehistoric bivalve genera
Nuculanidae
Molluscs described in 1951